This is a list of the heritage sites in Albany as recognised by the South African Heritage Resource Agency.

|}

Albany
Tourist attractions in the Eastern Cape
Heritage sites in Albany